Olga Jančić (Олга Јанчић; 1 February 1929, in Bitola – 25 October 2012, in Belgrade) was a Serbian sculptor.

References

Serbian sculptors
2012 deaths
1929 births
Serbian women sculptors